Mirza Ruhul Amin was a Jatiya Party (Ershad) politician and the former Member of Parliament of Thakurgaon-2. His son, Mirza Fakhrul Islam Alamgir, is the Secretary General of Bangladesh Nationalist Party.

Career
Amin served in the East Pakistan Assembly from 1965 to 1969. He was elected to parliament from Thakurgaon-2 as a Jatiya Party candidate in 1988. He had served as the Minister of Land in the cabinet of Hussain Mohammad Ershad.

Death
Amin died on 17 January 1997. Mirza Ruhul Amin auditorium in Thakurgaon was named after him.

References

Jatiya Party politicians
1997 deaths
4th Jatiya Sangsad members
2nd Jatiya Sangsad members